The Warley Hill Marl is a geologic formation in South Carolina. It preserves fossils dating back to the Paleogene period.

See also

 List of fossiliferous stratigraphic units in South Carolina
 Paleontology in South Carolina

References
 

Paleogene geology of South Carolina